Taroh Fujisaka (born 6 June 1994) is a Japanese judoka.

He is the silver medallist of the 2018 Judo Grand Prix Tunis in the -66 kg category.

References

External links
 

1994 births
Living people
Japanese male judoka